The 2019–20 Campbell Fighting Camels basketball team represented Campbell University in the 2019–20 NCAA Division I men's basketball season. The Fighting Camels, led by seventh-year head coach Kevin McGeehan, played their home games at Gore Arena in Buies Creek, North Carolina as members of the Big South Conference. They finished the season 15–16, 6–12 in Big South play to finish in a tie for tenth place. They lost in the first round of the Big South tournament to UNC Asheville.

Previous season
The Fighting Camels finished the 2018–19 season 20–13 overall, 12–4 in Big South play to finish as regular season co-champions, alongside Radford. In the Big South tournament, they defeated Hampton in the quarterfinals, before being upset by Gardner–Webb in the semifinals. As a regular season league champion who failed to win their conference tournament, they received an automatic bid to the NIT, where they were defeated by UNC Greensboro in the first round.

Roster

Schedule and results

|-
!colspan=12 style=| Exhibition

|-
!colspan=12 style=| Non-conference regular season

|-
!colspan=9 style=| Big South Conference regular season

|-
!colspan=12 style=| Big South tournament
|-

|-

Source

References

Campbell Fighting Camels basketball seasons
Campbell Fighting Camels
Campbell Fighting Camels basketball
Campbell Fighting Camels basketball